James Lewis Ingles (1876 – January 2, 1936) was an American football coach.  He served as the head football coach at Virginia Agricultural and Mechanical College and Polytechnic Institute (VPI)—now known as Virginia Tech—for one season in 1898, compiling a record of 3–2.  He was also an alumnus of Virginia Tech.

Head coaching record

References

External links
 

1876 births
1936 deaths
Virginia Tech Hokies football coaches
Virginia Tech Hokies football players